The fern genus Todea is known from only two living species. Species in the genus Todea, as Leptopteris, are distinct from other in Osmundaceae in that sporangia are born on laminar pinnules.

Description 
The species in the genus have a sub-erect stem and coarse, pinnate leaves. Many large sporangia are located on the bottoms of the leaves and are not arranged in sori or covered by an indusium.

Species 
Only two extant species are currently recognised. Todea barbara L., known as the king fern, is native to South Africa, New Zealand, and Australia while Todea papuana H. is known only from Papua New Guinea. 

So far the fossil record of the genus Todea consists only of the permineralized rhizome Todea tidwellii from the Lower Cretaceous of Vancouver Island, Canada and the species Todea amissa, known from the Eocene of Patagonia, Argentina.

References

Bibliography
 Nathan Jud, Gar W.Rothwell and Ruth A. Stockey. 2008. "Todea from the Lower Cretaceous of western North America: implications for the phylogeny, systematics, and evolution of modern Osmundaceae." American Journal of Botany, 95:330-339.
 E.Hennipman. 1968. A new Todea from New Guinea, with remarks on the generic delimitation of recent Osmundaceae. Blumea 16: 105-108
 C.Michael Hogan. 2010. Fern. Encyclopedia of Earth. eds. Saikat Basu and C.Cleveland. National Council for Science and the Environment. Washington DC.

External links
"Ferns and Fern Allies in the Canberra Region" - Todea barbara (King Fern) - includes photos (author: David Nicholls, January 1998).''

Osmundales
Ferns of Australasia
Fern genera